David Oliver Huffman (May 10, 1945 – February 27, 1985) was an American actor and producer.

Personal life
Huffman was born on May 10, 1945, in Berwyn, Illinois, to Clarence and Opal Huffman (née Dippel).

Huffman married casting director Phyllis Huffman (nee Grennan) in 1967, whom he had met as a student at Webster University in St. Louis, Missouri. The couple had two sons and remained married until Huffman's death in 1985.
  
Huffman was an avid sailer, recreational painter, and country‐and‐western guitarist.

Murder
On the morning of February 27, 16-year-old Genaro Samano Villanueva, was taken into San Diego police custody after attempting to steal a radio from a car near his home. Released into the custody of his high school vice principal, Villanueva left school and went to Balboa Park. There he was spotted by Canadian tourist Jack Beamer prowling around inside the motor home of Beamer's friends. After Beamer accosted him, Villanueva fled the scene.

Huffman, who was cast in the play Of Mice and Men at the Old Globe Theatre and was set to begin work on the television miniseries North and South the following week, had visited the theatre shortly before noon to share cookies with the cast and crew and was sitting in his van near the theatre playing his bagpipes when he saw Beamer confront  Villanueva. He gave chase in his vehicle, parking the van near the Spreckels Organ Pavilion and following Villanueva into the park. When he caught up with Villanueva, the two became involved in a physical altercation, during which Villanueva stabbed Huffman twice in the chest with a screwdriver. Huffman died of exsanguination, likely within 30 to 45 seconds. His body was found less than an hour later in a Palm Canyon crevice by a group of children, although it was not positively identified until later that night.

On March 2 and 3, Crime Stoppers produced a reenactment of the crime that was shown on San Diego television and published in several national newspapers. The Canadian tourists whose motor home was burglarized saw Huffman's photo and death announcement in the newspaper and called police. Huffman was buried on March 5 at Forest Lawn Memorial Park (Hollywood Hills).

Villanueva was arrested on March 12 after a police officer recognized Villanueva from a composite sketch given to police by the Canadian tourist. On June 24, 1986, Villanueva was sentenced to 26 years to life in prison and admitted to the California State Prison, Centinela. On December 9, 2011, he was denied parole for 15 years.

Broadway stage credits
Butterflies Are Free as Don Baker (October 21, 1969 – July 2, 1972)

Filmography

References

External links

David Huffman(Aveleyman) 
David Huffman at Find A Grave 
Huffman and Gloria Swanson in 1972 play version Butterflies Are Free:
Picture 1(archived)
Picture 2(archived)
Picture 3(archived)

1945 births
1985 deaths
1985 murders in the United States
20th-century American male actors
American male film actors
American male stage actors
American male television actors
Television producers from Illinois
Burials at Forest Lawn Memorial Park (Hollywood Hills)
Deaths by stabbing in the United States
Male actors from Illinois
People from Berwyn, Illinois
People murdered in California
20th-century American businesspeople